The 1998–99 SK Rapid Wien season is the 101st season in club history.

Squad statistics

Goal scorers

Fixtures and results

Bundesliga

League table

Cup

UEFA Cup

References

1998-99 Rapid Wien Season
Austrian football clubs 1998–99 season